Chinatown: Sa Kuko ng Dragon is a 1988 Filipino action film directed by Pepe Marcos and written by Humilde 'Meek' Roxas. It stars Ramon 'Bong' Revilla Jr., Tony Ferrer, Eddie Garcia, Aurora Sevilla, Mia Pratts, Rez Cortez, Christopher Paloma, Rommel Valdez, Baldo Marro, and Ruben Rustia. Produced and distributed by Four-N Films, the film was released on December 8, 1988.

Critic Lav Diaz noted Chinatowns intense violence, which he thought was influenced by the films of Arnold Schwarzenegger and Sylvester Stallone, and he expressed mixed feelings over the varying quality of the film's action scenes. The film received four FAMAS Award nominations, winning Best Picture - Action and Best Sound (Rolly Ruta).

Plot
A policeman named Daniel Moreno (Revilla) tries to singlehandedly defeat a syndicate involved in arms trafficking and drug smuggling as revenge for the murder of his sister and girlfriend.

Cast
Ramon 'Bong' Revilla Jr. as Daniel Moreno
Tony Ferrer as Peter Wang
Eddie Garcia as Maj. Mario G. Robles
Aurora Sevilla
Mia Pratts
Rez Cortez
Christopher Paloma
Rommel Valdez
Baldo Marro
Ruben Rustia
King Gutierrez
Mon Godiz
Manjo Del Mundo
Edwin Reyes
Ernie Forte
Rolando Gonzalez
Bomber Moran
Renato del Prado
Nilo Nuqui

Release
Chinatown was given a "P-15" rating by the Movie and Television Review and Classification Board (MTRCB), and was released on December 8, 1988.

Critical response
Lav Diaz, writing for the Manila Standard, saw the film as another Filipino work influenced by the intense violence of films starring Sylvester Stallone or Arnold Schwarzenegger, stating that "Children too, [are] riddled with bullets." He gave mixed feelings for the action sequences, praising the chase scene involving a car and the action scenes at the start and the end of the film, but criticizing others for being basically filler. Diaz considers the love scene between Revilla's character and his lover to be the film's most memorable moment.

Accolades

References

External links

1988 films
1988 action films
Filipino-language films
Films about police officers
Films set in Manila
Philippine action films
Philippine films about revenge
Films directed by Pepe Marcos